María Isabel Salazar García (born 22 September 1980) is a Bolivian former footballer who played as a midfielder. She has been a member of the Bolivia women's national team.

Early life
Salazar hails from the La Paz Department.

International career
Salazar capped for Bolivia at senior level during the 2006 South American Women's Football Championship.

References

1980 births
Living people
People from La Paz Department (Bolivia)
Bolivian women's footballers
Women's association football midfielders
Bolivia women's international footballers